Sir Michael Hugh Shaw-Stewart, 8th Baronet   (11 July 1854 – 29 June 1942) was a Scottish politician, soldier and landowner.

Biography 
He was the eldest son of Sir Michael Shaw-Stewart, 7th Baronet, and Lady Octavia Grosvenor, daughter of Richard Grosvenor, 2nd Marquess of Westminster. He was educated at Eton and Christ Church, Oxford. He was a Captain in the 4th Battalion (Princess Louise's), the Argyll and Sutherland Highlanders and Honorary Colonel of the 5/6th Argyll and Sutherland Highlanders.

He was unsuccessful Conservative parliamentary candidate for Stirlingshire in 1885, and was elected for East Renfrewshire in 1886, holding the seat until 1906.

In 1903, he succeeded his father in the baronetcy and as Laird of Ardgowan. He was awarded the CB in the 1916 Birthday Honours and knighted in the same order in the 1933 Birthday Honours. He was Lord Lieutenant of Renfrewshire from 1922 until his death and was also chairman of the county council.

In 1883, he married Lady Alice Emma Thynne , daughter of John Thynne, 4th Marquess of Bath. There were no surviving children of the marriage. He died in a nursing home in Glasgow, aged 87.  He was succeeded by his nephew, Col. Sir Walter Guy Shaw-Stewart, 9th Baronet .

See also 
 Shaw Stewart baronets

References

External links 
 

1854 births
1942 deaths
Argyll and Sutherland Highlanders officers
Baronets in the Baronetage of Nova Scotia
Knights Commander of the Order of the Bath
Lord-Lieutenants of Renfrewshire
Members of the Parliament of the United Kingdom for Scottish constituencies
Scottish justices of the peace
UK MPs 1886–1892
UK MPs 1892–1895
UK MPs 1895–1900
UK MPs 1900–1906
Scottish Tory MPs (pre-1912)
People educated at Eton College